John Henry Schaffner (1866–1939) was an American botanist and professor at Ohio State University. He is known for his contributions to the floral diagram and for his work on reduction division. Schaffner is the botanical authority, for seven taxa that bear his name, such as Equisetum kansanum J.H.Schaffn..

References

Bibliography

External links 

American botanists
1866 births
1939 deaths